Ano Vlasia is a mountain village in the municipality of Kalavryta, Achaea, Greece. It is situated at about 900 m elevation. near the source of the river Selinountas, east of the highest summit of Mount Erymanthos. It is 1 km south of Kato Vlasia, 6 km north of Lechouri and 18 km west of Kalavryta.

Population

See also
List of settlements in Achaea

References

External links
 Ano Vlasia on GTP Travel Pages

Kalavryta
Populated places in Achaea